Announcement may refer to:
 "Announcement" (song), a 2008 song by Common
 Announcement (computing), a message about a new software version
 Campaign announcement, a type of political speech
 Public service announcement, a media message in the public interest
 Press release, a communication via news media